Julie E Miller (born November 21, 1972) is an American harness racing driver and trainer.

Biography

Miller, who was born in Iowa City, Iowa, drove her first winner at Quad City Downs in 1993.  She has a bachelor's degree in science from Southern Illinois University.

Julie Miller was elected to the board of trustees for the Harness Horse Youth Foundation in 2008.

Miller trained 2009 Dan Patch award winner Lucky Jim.

In February 2016, Miller along with another harness driver were charged with allowing horses to race with the drug Glaucine in their system. Miller denied the accusations. Less than two years earlier Miller had said in an interview that it was disappointing that drugs was one of the major things talked about in harness racing.

Family

Miller, along with her husband Andy who is a harness racing driver, live in Millstone Township, New Jersey. They have two children. Harness racing trainer Erv Miller is her brother-in-law.

References

External links
Julie Miller Profile

1972 births
Living people
American harness racers
Southern Illinois University alumni
Sportspeople from Iowa City, Iowa
Sportspeople from Monmouth County, New Jersey
People from Millstone Township, New Jersey